Bill Arnold may refer to:

Bill Arnold (cinematographer), American cinematographer
Bill Arnold (ice hockey) (born 1992), American ice hockey player
Bill Arnold (politician), Arizona politician

See also 
 Billy Arnold (disambiguation)
 William Arnold (disambiguation)